Dolomedes scriptus is a fishing spider found in the United States and Canada, known as the striped fishing spider. Female spiders can grow to be over 6 cm in legspan. The spider is a pale brown colour with lighter stripes around its legs and a stripe down each side of the body. It is similar to D. tenebrosus.

References

Further reading
Dolomedes scriptus, The Nearctic Spider Database, GBIF
Bishop, S. C. 1924. A revision of the Pisauridae of the United States. New York St. Mus. Bull. 252: 1-140.
Carico, J. E. 1973. The Nearctic species of the genus Dolomedes (Araneae: Pisauridae). Bull. Mus. comp. Zool. Harv. 144: 435-488.
Carico, J. E. & P. C. Holt. 1964. A comparative study of the female copulatory apparatus of certain species in the spider genus Dolomedes (Pisauridae: Araneae). Tech. Bull. agric. Exp. Stat. Blacksburg Virg. 172: 1-27.
Comstock, J. H. 1940. The spider book, revised and edited by W. J. Gertsch. Cornell Univ. Press, Ithaca, xi + 727 pp.
Comstock, J. H. 1912. The spider book; a manual for the study of the spiders and their near relatives, the scorpions, pseudoscorpions, whipscorpions, harvestmen and other members of the class Arachnida, found in America north of Mexico, with analytical keys for their classification and popular accounts of their habits. Garden City, New York, pp. 1–721
Dondale, C. D. & J. H. Redner. 1990. The insects and arachnids of Canada, Part 17. The wolf spiders, nurseryweb spiders, and lynx spiders of Canada and Alaska, Araneae: Lycosidae, Pisauridae, and Oxyopidae. Research Branch, Agriculture Canada, Publ. 1856: 1-383.
Emerton, J. H. 1902. The common spiders of the United States. Boston, pp. 1–225.
Emerton, J. H. 1885. New England Lycosidae. Trans. Conn. Acad. Arts Sci. 6: 481-505.
Hentz, N. M. 1845. Descriptions and figures of the araneides of the United States. Boston J. nat. Hist. 5: 189-202.
Kaston, B. J. 1948. Spiders of Connecticut. Bull. Conn. St. geol. nat. Hist. Surv. 70: 1-874.
Montgomery, T. H. 1904. Descriptions of North American Araneae of the families Lycosidae and Pisauridae. Proc. Acad. nat. Sci. Philad. 56: 261-325.
Muma, M. H. 1943. Common spiders of Maryland. Natural History Society of Maryland, Baltimore, 179 pp.
Paquin, P. & N. Dupérré. 2003. Guide d'identification des araignées du Québec. Fabreries, Suppl. 11 1-251.
Sierwald, P. 1989. Morphology and ontogeny of female copulatory organs in American Pisauridae, with special reference to homologous features (Arachnida: Araneae). Smithson. Contrib. Zool. 484: 1-24.

scriptus
Spiders of North America
Spiders described in 1845